Mailó da Graça da Cruz (born 10 January 1992 in São Vicente), known simply as Mailó, is a Cape Verdean professional footballer who plays for Portuguese club S.C. Olhanense as a centre forward.

References

External links

1992 births
Living people
People from São Vicente, Cape Verde
Cape Verdean footballers
Association football forwards
CS Mindelense players
Primeira Liga players
Liga Portugal 2 players
Segunda Divisão players
Leixões S.C. players
C.F. Os Belenenses players
S.C. Farense players
S.C. Covilhã players
C.D. Mafra players
Varzim S.C. players
S.C. Olhanense players
Cape Verdean expatriate footballers
Expatriate footballers in Portugal
Cape Verdean expatriate sportspeople in Portugal